Ahmed Ghmin Aboud is an Iraqi Olympic boxer. He represented his country in the bantamweight division at the 1992 Summer Olympics. His first round he had a bye and then lost his first bout to Wayne McCullough.

References

1970 births
Living people
Iraqi male boxers
Olympic boxers of Iraq
Boxers at the 1992 Summer Olympics
Bantamweight boxers